The Smoky God, or A Voyage Journey to the Inner Earth is a book presented as a true account written by Willis George Emerson in 1908, which describes the adventures of Olaf Jansen, a Norwegian sailor who sailed with his father through an entrance to the Earth's interior at the North Pole.

Plot introduction

For two years Jansen lived with the inhabitants of an underground network of colonies who, Emerson writes, were 12 feet tall and whose world was lit by a "smoky" central sun. Their capital city was said to be the original Garden of Eden. Later works by other authors, such as Agartha - Secrets of the Subterranean Cities, have identified the civilization Jansen encountered with Agartha (a mythical subterranean city), although Emerson did not use the name.

External links 
 
 The Smoky God, at sacred-texts.com
 

1908 American novels
1908 science fiction novels
American science fiction novels
Hollow Earth in fiction
Lost world novels